Park Hotels & Resorts is a real estate investment trust (REIT) focused on hotel properties, based in Tysons, Virginia. It was formed in 2017 as a spin-off from Hilton Worldwide.

History
Hilton Worldwide CEO Christopher Nassetta stated in June 2015 that the company was evaluating a corporate spin-off of a REIT to hold its $13-billion real estate portfolio. The plan was part of Nassetta's strategy of moving Hilton to an "asset-light" business model, to enable rapid international growth. It was also meant to take advantage of the lack of corporate income taxes on REITs. Hilton announced definitive plans in February 2016 to spin off a REIT (Park Hotels & Resorts) and its timeshare business (Hilton Grand Vacations) as separate companies. The spin-offs were completed on January 4, 2017. Park Hotels became the second-largest publicly traded hotel REIT, with holdings of 67 hotels.

In 2018, Park Hotels sold 13 hotels that it considered "non-core" assets, including 10 of its 14 international properties, for a total of $519 million.

HNA Group, which had owned 25 percent of the company, sold all its shares in March 2018 in a stock buyback and a secondary offering for a total of $1.4 billion.

In 2019, Park acquired Chesapeake Lodging Trust for $1 billion in cash plus $978 million in stock. The purchase added eighteen hotels to Park's portfolio, and diversified it by adding hotel brands franchised from Marriott, Hyatt, and others.

The company sold another 10 hotels in 2019 and 2020, including its last remaining properties outside of the United States, for total proceeds of $688 million. Another 5 hotels were sold in 2021 for proceeds of $477 million, producing a net loss of $5 million on these properties. Four more properties were sold in 2022 for a total of $260 million, as part of the company's long-term deleveraging plan.

Properties
Park Hotels & Resorts has whole or partial ownership of 50 hotels, containing 30,000 rooms. The bulk of the hotels operate under brands licensed from Hilton Worldwide, including Hilton, DoubleTree, and Embassy Suites. Park Hotels manages four of the properties itself; the remainder are managed by other companies, most of them by Hilton Worldwide.

Notable hotels owned by the company include:

Capital Hilton – Washington, DC (25% interest)
Caribe Hilton – San Juan, Puerto Rico
Hilton Chicago – Chicago, Illinois
Hilton Hawaiian Village – Honolulu, Hawaii
Hilton New Orleans Riverside – New Orleans, Louisiana
Hilton Orlando Bonnet Creek – Orlando, Florida
Hilton Orlando Lake Buena Vista – Lake Buena Vista, Florida
Hilton San Francisco Union Square – San Francisco, California
Hilton Waikoloa Village – Puako, Hawaii
JW Marriott San Francisco Union Square – San Francisco, California
New York Hilton Midtown – Manhattan, New York
Waldorf Astoria Orlando – Orlando, Florida

Former properties
Ace Hotel Downtown Los Angeles — Los Angeles, California – Acquired in 2019 and sold in 2019
Embassy Suites Washington DC Georgetown – Washington, DC — Sold in 2020
Hilton San Diego Bayfront – San Diego, California (25% interest) – Sold in 2022
Le Méridien New Orleans — New Orleans, Louisiana — Acquired in 2019 and sold in 2019
Le Méridien San Francisco – San Francisco, California — Acquired in 2019 and sold in 2021

References

External links

Hospitality companies of the United States
Real estate investment trusts of the United States
Companies based in Fairfax County, Virginia
American companies established in 2017
Real estate companies established in 2017
2017 establishments in Virginia
Tysons, Virginia
Companies listed on the Nasdaq
Corporate spin-offs
Hilton Worldwide